Francisco Espinosa (born 7 May 1962) is a Spanish former professional racing cyclist. He rode in the Tour de France and Giro d'Italia.

References

External links
 

1962 births
Living people
Spanish male cyclists
Sportspeople from Granada
Cyclists from Andalusia